Friargate is a new business district in Coventry, currently under construction. Covering  surrounding Coventry railway station, once complete Friargate will be made up of 25 new buildings, including 14 Grade A office buildings, two hotels and new homes.

The project is scheduled to take 15 years to complete and is thought to be providing 15,000 new jobs at a cost of £100 million.  It has been described by the Coventry Telegraph as one of the twelve new developments that will change Coventry forever.

The former leader of Coventry City Council, Cllr Ann Lucas, has stated that developments such as Friargate will help the city achieve its aim of being a top 10 UK city.

On 10 March 2016 Station Square, the new public thoroughfare created as part of the development, was opened by Cllr Lucas. The space features more than 200 trees, stone benches and seats and was heralded as proof that Friargate is already changing the area.

Ownership

Friargate Coventry LLP is the organisation that has been formed to bring forward the development of Friargate. This organisation is the development vehicle for Cannon Cannon Kirk, a Dublin-based property group.

Location
Friargate surrounds Coventry railway station, covering . The new business district will be located to the south of the city, in close proximity to Junction 6 of the Coventry ring road, Central 6 Retail Park and the King Henry VIII School.

The extensive, reliable, transport connections have been cited as a key factor in locating development of this scale at the Friargate site.

History
The modern station has been located on this site since 1962, after it was rebuilt following heavy bombing during the Blitz in 1940, it is now a Grade-II listed building. However, a station has been located on the site since 1838.

Office buildings and retail units have also been located on this site since the 1960s, the most prominent of which was Station Tower. This was demolished in October 2015 to make way for the Friargate development, after being deemed no longer fit for purpose and outdated. 

Retail outlets located on the site included Shimla Spice, which relocated to new premises in The Butts, Spon End once demolition commenced.

A time capsule has also been buried underneath the development, and will be unearthed in 50 years’ time to show future generations what life was like when Friargate was being constructed. The items inside the capsule were chosen by people in Coventry and were buried by pupils from St Osburg’s, Spon Gate and All Saints C of E primary schools.

Coventry City Council
Coventry City Council is working in partnership with Friargate Coventry LLP to promote the development, and has agreed to become tenants in the first building in the Friargate Masterplan.
The 13-storey, £40 million, building will accommodate Council workers – with the existing Council House remaining as a base for councillors and council meetings.

Leading councillors praised the design and look of the building, and were reportedly extremely pleased with it. Coventry Council’s then leader – Cllr Ann Lucas – commented:

"For me, this new council house has the wow factor. I like the colour of the building as I feel it is incredibly important that we tie in some of the historical parts of the city to this new development. It obviously needs to be functional, but you also want the new building to be attractive. And as other buildings come along, they will complement each other but be different in design."

Completion
The Friargate development is a 15-year project. However, the first building was ready for occupation by Coventry City Council in October 2017  and a planning application for the second building, designed by architects Allies & Morrison, was granted permission on 22 June 2016. On Tuesday 27 August 2019, Coventry City Council’s cabinet granted the lease on land at Friargate for Castlebridge Group to launch a new 100-bed hotel

References

Suburbs of Coventry